Mahmoudia Canal ( Agathos Daimon or  Megas potamos) is a  sub-canal from the Nile River which starts at the Nile-port of Mahmoudia and goes through Alexandria to the Mediterranean Sea. It was built to supply Alexandria with food and fresh water from the Nile.

History

Prior to 1817
The first freshwater canal from the Nile to Alexandria was built under the rule of the Ptolemy I.
Ibn Batuta (1304–1369), the Moroccan traveller, in his "Rihla: My Travels", discusses passing through Alexandria in 1326 and references a canal from Alexandria to The Nile that was finished a few years before his arrival. This might contradict with Wali Muhammad Ali building it almost four centuries later. However, regarding the geographic location and the fact that this part of the land, which has been reclaimed not a long time ago, was plain desert then, the canal might have been covered in sand sometime before it was re-established, not necessarily following the same route, by Muhammed Ali of Egypt.

The digging process
On 8 May 1817, Viceroy Mohamed Ali ordered to dig a canal from the Nile River close to Alatf village to deliver the water of the Nile to Alexandria through Beheira and to be a path for cargo ships. He ordered to group workers and tools necessary to start the digging work. During the digging process, some old houses covered in sand were found which had ancient boxes inside; some of them were opened and some others were sent to Mohamed Ali without their content being known. In April 1819 the work stopped due to plague. In January 1820, the canal was completed and named after Sultan Mahmud II, the Sultan of Istanbul, as Egypt then was an Ottoman province.

After 1820
Within twenty years after the canal was dug, it filled with sand and became almost impassable, and it was only after Muhammad Sa'id Pasha came to power that it was cleansed and made navigable again.

A contract between the Prussian Baron de Pentz and the Pasha to use the canal for the provisioning of Alexandria in the first half of the nineteenth century came to an end due to a disagreement over the hoisting of a Prussian flag. In the 1850s, a new steam-tug company was formed with approval from the pasha to use the canal. Its board of directors included Jules Pastré, Alexander G. Cassavetti, Ange Adolphe Levi, Alexander Tod, and Moise Valensin. The pasha ordered the new company to replace the old locks with newer, bigger gates and to provide for the cleansing and upkeep of the canal.

Map from the time of construction
In the French Carte Topographique de l'Egypte, investigated while the canal was built, and published in 1818, the canal is called Canal of Alexandria (الإسكندرية  ﺧﻠﻴﺞ — Khalīg al-Iskandariyya). In that map the bifurcation from the Nile is 20 upstream of the modern bifurcation and yet there are no totally straight sections.

See also
 Suez Canal
 Ibrahimiya Canal

References

Canals in Egypt
Canals opened in 1820